Timothy Brendan Kennelly (17 April 1936 – 17 October 2021), usually known as Brendan Kennelly, was an Irish poet and novelist.  He was Professor of Modern Literature at Trinity College Dublin until 2005.  Following his retirement he was a Professor Emeritus at Trinity College.

Early life
Kennelly was born in Ballylongford, County Kerry, on 17 April 1936.  He was one of eight children of Tim Kennelly and Bridie (Ahern).  His father worked as a publican and garage proprietor; his mother was a nurse.  Kennelly was educated at the inter-denominational St. Ita's College, Tarbert, County Kerry.  He was then awarded a scholarship to study English and French at Trinity College Dublin.  There he was editor of Icarus and captained the Trinity Gaelic Football Club.  He graduated from Trinity in 1961 with first-class honours, before obtaining a Doctor of Philosophy there in 1967.  He also studied at Leeds University for one year under the tutelage of Norman Jeffares. He became a fellow of Trinity College Dublin in 1967, and a senior fellow in 1989.

Poetry
Kennelly's poetry can be scabrous, down-to-earth, and colloquial.  He avoided intellectual pretension and literary posturing, and his attitude to poetic language could be summed up in the title of one of his epic poems, "Poetry my Arse".  Another long (400-page) epic poem, "The Book of Judas", published in 1991, topped the Irish best-seller list.

A prolific and fluent writer, there are more than fifty volumes of poetry to his credit, including My Dark Fathers (1964), Collection One: Getting Up Early (1966), Good Souls to Survive (1967), Dream of a Black Fox (1968), Love Cry (1972), The Voices (1973), Shelley in Dublin (1974), A Kind of Trust (1975), Islandman (1977), A Small Light (1979), and The House That Jack Didn't Build (1982).

Kennelly edited several other anthologies, including "Between Innocence and Peace: Favourite Poems of Ireland" (1993), "Ireland's Women: Writings Past and Present, with Katie Donovan and A. Norman Jeffares" (1994), and "Dublines," with Katie Donovan (1995).  He also authored two novels, "The Crooked Cross" (1963) and "The Florentines" (1967), and three plays in a Greek Trilogy, Antigone, Medea, and The Trojan Women.

Kennelly was an Irish language (Gaelic) speaker, and translated Irish poems in "A Drinking Cup" (1970) and "Mary" (Dublin 1987).  A selection of his collected translations was published as "Love of Ireland: Poems from the Irish" (1989).

Style
Language was important in Kennelly's work – in particular the vernacular of the small and isolated communities in North Kerry where he grew up, and of the Dublin streets and pubs where he became both roamer and raconteur for many years.  His language is also grounded in the Irish-language poetic tradition, oral and written, which can be both satirical and salacious in its approach to human follies.

Regarding the oral tradition, Kennelly was a great reciter of verse with tremendous command and the rare ability to recall extended poems by memory, both his own work and others, and recite them on call verbatim.  He commented on his own use of language: "Poetry is an attempt to cut through the effects of deadening familiarity … to reveal that inner sparkle."

Personal life
Kennelly married Margaret (Peggy) O'Brien in 1969.  They were colleagues at the time, and she taught at English at the University of Massachusetts, Amherst at the time of his death.  Together, they had one child, Kristen “Doodle” Kennelly.  They resided in Sandymount before getting divorced, which Kennelly attributed to his overindulgence in alcohol.  He ultimately became teetotal in about 1985.  Doodle died in April 2021, six months before her father.

Kennelly died on 17 October 2021, at a care home in Listowel, where he resided in the two years leading up to his death.  He was 85 years old.

Awards and honours
 1967 Æ Memorial Prize
 1988 Critics Special Harvey's Award
 1996 IMPAC International Dublin Literary Award
 1999 American Ireland Fund Literary Award
 2003 The Ireland Funds of France Wild Geese Award
 2010 Irish PEN Award

List of works
 Cast a Cold Eye (1959) with Rudi Holzapfel
 The Rain, the Moon (1961) with Rudi Holzapfel
 The Dark About Our Loves (1962) Rudi Holzapfel
 Green Townlands (1963) Rudi Holzapfel
 Let Fall No Burning Leaf (1963)
 The Crooked Cross (1963) novel; 
 My Dark Fathers (1964)
 Up and at It (1965)
 Collection One: Getting Up Early (1966)
 Good Souls to Survive (1967)
 The Florentines (1967) novel
 Dream of a Black Fox (1968) 
 Selected Poems (1969)
 A Drinking Cup, Poems from the Irish (1970) 
 The Penguin Book of Irish Verse (1970, 1981) editor
 Bread (1971) 
 Love Cry (1972) 
 Salvation, The Stranger (1972) 
 The Voices (1973) 
 Shelley in Dublin (1974)
 A Kind of Trust (1975) 
 New and Selected Poems (1976) 
 The Boats Are Home (Gallery Press, 1980) 
 Moloney Up and at It (Mercier Press, 1984) 
 Cromwell (Beaver Row Press, 1983; Bloodaxe Books, 1987) 
 Mary, from the Irish of Muireadach Albanach Ó Dálaigh (Aisling Press, 1987)
 Landmarks of Irish Drama (Methuen, 1988) 
 Love of Ireland: Poems from the Irish (Mercier Press, 1989) [anthology] 
 A Time for Voices: Selected Poems 1960–1990 (Bloodaxe Books, 1990) 
 Euripides' Medea (Bloodaxe Books, 1991) 
 The Book of Judas (Bloodaxe Books, 1991) 
 Breathing Spaces: Early Poems (Bloodaxe Books, 1992) 
 Euripides' The Trojan Women (Bloodaxe Books, 1993) 
 Journey into Joy: Selected Prose, ed. Åke Persson (Bloodaxe Books, 1994) 
 Between Innocence and Peace: Favourite Poems of Ireland (Mercier Press, 1994) [anthology] 
 Poetry My Arse (Bloodaxe Books, 1995) 
 Dublines, with Katie Donovan (Bloodaxe Books, 1996) [anthology] 
 Sophocles' Antigone: a new version (Bloodaxe Books, 1996) 
 Lorca: Blood Wedding (Bloodaxe Books, 1996) 
 The Man Made of Rain (Bloodaxe Books, 1998) 
 The Singing Tree (Abbey Press, 1998) 
 Begin (Bloodaxe Books, 1999) 
 Glimpses (Bloodaxe Books, 2001) 
 The Little Book of Judas (Bloodaxe Books, 2002) 
 Martial Art (Bloodaxe Books, 2003)  [versions of Martial]
 Familiar Strangers: New & Selected Poems (Bloodaxe Books, 2004) 
 Now (Bloodaxe Books, 2006) 
 When Then Is Now: Three Greek Tragedies (Bloodaxe Books, 2006)  [versions of Sophocles' Antigone and Euripides''' Medea and The Trojan Women]
 Reservoir Voices (Bloodaxe Books, 2009) 
 The Essential Brendan Kennelly: Selected Poems (Bloodaxe Books, UK & Ireland, 2011, Wake Forest University Press, USA, 2011) 
 Guff'' (Bloodaxe Books, 2013)

References

External links 
 Bloodaxe Books (Publisher of Kennelly's work in the UK and Ireland)
 Wake Forest University Press (US publisher)
 
 

1936 births
2021 deaths
Academics of Trinity College Dublin
Alumni of Trinity College Dublin
Alumni of the University of Leeds
Fellows of Trinity College Dublin
Irish dramatists and playwrights
Irish male dramatists and playwrights
Irish editors
People from County Kerry
Translators from Irish
20th-century Irish novelists
20th-century Irish male writers
Irish male novelists
20th-century Irish poets
Irish male poets
21st-century Irish poets
Irish PEN Award for Literature winners
20th-century Irish translators
21st-century Irish translators
21st-century Irish male writers